Navy Department or Department of the Navy may refer to:

 United States Department of the Navy, 
 Navy Department (Ministry of Defence), in the United Kingdom, 1964-1997
 Confederate States Department of the Navy, 1861-1865
 Department of the Navy (Australia), 1939-1973

See also
 Department of Naval Services, in Canada, 1910-1922
 Ministry of the Navy (disambiguation)